The Tamang (Devanagari: तामाङ; tāmāṅ), are a Tibeto-Burmese ethnic group of Nepal, Southern Bhutan and North India. In Nepal Tamang/Moormi people constitute 5.6% of the Nepalese population at over 1.3 million in 2001, increasing to 1,539,830 as of the 2011 census. Tamang people are concentrated in the central hilly region of Nepal. Indian Tamangs are found in significant numbers in the state of Sikkim and districts of Darjeeling and Kalimpong in West Bengal state. Bhutanese Tamangs are native to various districts in the southern foothills of the Kingdom of Bhutan. Such districts include the Tsirang District, the Dagana District, the Samtse District, the Chukha District, the Sarpang District and the Samdrup Jongkhar District. Tamang language is the fifth most-spoken language in Nepal.

Etymology
Tamang may have been derived from the word Tamang, where Ta means "horse" and Mak means "warrior" in Tibetan. However, there are no written documentations of Horse Riders. Some scientific research claims Tamangs having Prehistoric and Genetic roots.

History 
The Tamangs, who have lived from hills outside the Kathmandu Valley to the southern slope of Langtang, Ganesh, Jugal himal and Rolwaling probably since pre-historic time, have been mentioned in various Nepalese and colonial historical records under a variety of names, such as Bhote, Lama, Murmi, Sain some of which terms erroneously conflate the Tamangs with Uighurs. Meanwhile, the Tibetans called them Rongpa.

Various Gorkha rulers led campaigns against the Indigenous Tamangs, The Gorkha Vamsavali provides details of battles with the Bhotyas of a variety of principalities between 1806 and 1862. In 1739, a ruler named Ghale-Botya attacked Narabhupal Shah as he was marching towards Nuwakot, and Narabhupal Shah also fought several battles against Golma Ghale. In 1762, Prithvi Narayan Shah attacked the Tamangs in Temal, the Tamang cultural heartland. Tamang oral history tells how the local chief, Rinjen Dorje, was killed by the Gorkhas, In the fight time gorkhali forces had hidden their weapons in the sand on the Sunkoshi riverbank. for attacking on tamang forces. Afterwards, later at end of war Gorkhas washed their weapons in springs as Dapcha Kuwapani, and this is why to the modern day tamangs do not drink there. Similar stories appear in oral histories throughout the region.

After the attacking of the Tamang region, their homeland traditional area, known as kipat to the Gorkhas, was granted to Gorkha generals or government officials who had pleased the king in some way, displacing the Tamangs from kipat lands. Previously Tamang landholdings had been divided up by clan. Tamangs also had various forced labour obligations, both in times of peace and war, that differed significantly from other regions of Nepal. One reason is the proximity of the Tamang homeland to the centre of royal administration at Kathmandu.

Tamangs were also involved in the Sino-Nepalese War (Nepali: नेपाल-चीन युद्ध), also known as the Sino-Gorkha war and in Chinese the campaign of Gorkha (Chinese: 廓爾喀之役).The war was initially fought between Nepalese Gorkhas and Tibetan armies over a trade dispute related to a long-standing problem of low-quality coins manufactured by Nepal for Tibet. It is believed that Tibetans who travelled to Nepal for trade purposes had settled in and around Kathmandu valley.

Political participation

Some ethnographers have drawn a link between Tamang people and ancient Mongol populations who emigrated to the Himalayas. Tamsaling Nepal Rastriya Dal, and the more broadly representative Mongol National Organisation (MNO), support self-determination for Tamangs and campaign on an discrimination platform. The MNO opposes conversion of non-Hindus to Hinduism. It currently holds no official parliamentary vote. The Federal Limbuwan State Council (FLSC) also works towards similar goals for self-determination for the Kirati peoples, who co-mingle with Tamangs, citing a reneged treaty with Kathmandu for autonomy. The associated Sanghiya Limbuwan Party has participated in calling a banda during the 2015 Nepal blockade in an attempt to draw attention to their demands. In the 1980s, a militant Gorkhaland movement within India led by the prominent  Subhas Ghising was viewed as a security threat due to its activities in and around the strategically significant Siliguri Corridor. Madan Tamang, a Tamang-Indian politician and proponent for Gorkhaland statehood, was assassinated in 2010, with the West Bengal government placing blame on another Gorkhaland political party. The Gorkhaland Territorial Administration was created as a compromise to Ghorkaland statehood in India. In Nepal, ethnic tensions between indigenous groups and khas peoples remains an issue. In 2017 Binay Tamang was appointed as the Chairperson of GTA.

Culture 
Tamang tradition and culture includes a distinct language, culture, dress and social structure. They have over 100 sub-clans. About 90% of the Tamang are Buddhist. Their language, Tamang, comes from the Tamangic branch of the Tibeto-Burman language family and is closely related to Gurung. They follow the Chinese lunar calendar of the 12-year cycle. Colorful printed Buddhist mantra cloths are put up in various places in villages and towns.

Their typical song and dance style is known as Tamang Selo, and includes songs representing humor, satire, joy and sorrow. It has a brisk movement and rhythmic beat specific to the Tamangs. A distinctive musical instrument is the damphu, a small, round drum covered with goatskin. Traditional Tamang songs are known as Hwai. Sung by Tamang genealogists called Tamba, Hwai songs are ritualistic and hold tremendous importance in Tamang rituals.

Festivals
Sonam Lhosar is the main festival of the Tamangs and is celebrated in the month of Magh (February–March). It is celebrated to welcome the Tamang new year.

Also significant is Buddha Jayanti, a religious festival based on birthday of Gautam Buddha.

Trekking and tourism
Tamang villages are often visited on Nepal's numerous trekking routes, one being labelled Tamang Heritage Trail.

Notable Tamang people 
 Tilak Bahadur Negi Lama तिलक बहादुर नेगी - Nepalese politician, first minister of Nepal Tamang Communities in June 16 1981 (२०३८ असार २ गते) from Makawanpur, Nepal.
 Kabiraj Negi Lama - Nepal National Para Taekwondo Team Coach and 2020 Summer Paralympics Coach
 Bidhan Lama - He won bronze medals at the 1986 Asian Games, 1987 World Taekwondo Championships and at the 1988 Summer Olympics
 Madan Tamang - Indian politician and the president of Akhil Bharatiya Gorkha League (ABGL)
Subhash Ghisingh - founding leader of Gorkha National Liberation Front (GNLF)
Prem Singh Tamang- 6th and current Chief Minister of the Indian state of Sikkim
 Parijat (Bishnu Kumari Waiba)  - Indian-born Nepali writer
 Jyoti Prakash Tamang - Indian microbiologist, known for his work on fermented foods of Himalayan region
 Mahendra P. Lama - Indian political analyst and development economist
Nim Dorjee Tamang - Indian footballer
 Nagen Tamang - Indian footballer from Kurseong
Nim Dorjee Tamang - Indian footballer
 Nagen Tamang - Indian footballer
 Hira Devi Waiba - Nepali Tamang Selo singer
 Aruna Lama - singer, also known as 'Nightingale of the Hills'.
Navneet Aditya Waiba - singer
Gopal Yonjan- musician, music producer, and composer
 Raju Lama- singer, lead vocalist of Mongolian Heart band.
 Karma Yonzon- singer, musician, music producer, and composer
 Buddha Lama- first Nepal Idol winner, singer, musician, Composer
 Nima Rumba- singer, musician, composer, and actor
 Prashant Tamang- third Indian Idol winner, singer, actor
 Phiroj Shyangden- singer and composer of 1974 Band 
 VTEN (Samir Ghising) - rapper
Robin Tamang - rock musician and actor
Kul Man Ghising - engineer, managing director of Nepal Electricity Authority 
Bhim Bahadur Tamang - politician
 Ananta Tamang - Nepalese professional footballer
 Sunil Bal - Nepalese professional footballer
 Ayush Ghalan - Nepalese professional footballer
 Tej Tamang - Nepalese professional footballer
 Santosh Tamang - Nepalese professional footballer
 Suman Lama - Nepalese professional footballer
 Aashish Lama - Nepalese professional footballer
 Bikram Lama - Nepalese professional footballer
 Anu Lama - Nepalese professional footballer
 Raju Tamang - Nepalese professional footballer
 Devendra Tamang - Nepalese professional footballer
 Ratnajit Tamang - Nepalese professional badminton
 Chintan tamang - Nepalese politician 
 Shrijana Ghising - Nepalese Para Taekwondo practitioner
two times mayor in 2074 and 2079 of dhankuta Mr. Chintan Tamang https://g.co/kgs/goWVt4

Gallery

See also 
 Daman people

References

External links 

 

Buddhist communities of India
Buddhist communities of Nepal
Sino-Tibetan-speaking people
Ethnic groups in Nepal
Ethnic groups in Northeast India
Ethnic groups in South Asia